Stara Rudna  is a village in the administrative district of Gmina Rudna, within Lubin County, Lower Silesian Voivodeship, in south-western Poland. Prior to 1945 it was in Germany.

The village has a population of 140.

The place, originally called Ruda, may have developed out of an old Slavic castle and a church built in approximately 1100 by Piotr Włostowic of Dunin, though no documents are saved.

Christian Knorr von Rosenroth, a Christian Hebraist, was born in Alt Raudten in 1631.

References

Stara Rudna